Cupriavidus gilardii is a Gram-negative, aerobic, motile, oxidase-positive bacterium from the genus  Cupriavidus and the family Burkholderiaceae. It is motil by a single polar flagellum. It is named after G. L. Gilardi, an American microbiologist. The organism was initially identified as Ralstonia gilardii in 1999, renamed Wautersiella gilardii, and most recently moved into the genus Cupriavidus after 16S rRNA gene sequencing revealed it to be most closely related to Cupriavidus necator. Notably, species of this genus are not inhibited by copper due to the production of chelation factors, and may actually be stimulated by the presence of copper.

Clinical significance
Cupriavidus gilardii may be resistant to multiple antibiotic agents; carbapenem-resistant C. gilardii has been found in stool surveillance cultures and has been associated with fatal human infection.

References

External links
Type strain of Cupriavidus gilardii at BacDive -  the Bacterial Diversity Metadatabase

Burkholderiaceae
Bacteria described in 2004